World Pro Championships may refer to:

 German Pro Championships
 Women's Pro World Bodybuilding, former IFBB female professional bodybuilding competition